In computing, net is a command in IBM OS/2 (including eComStation and ArcaOS), Microsoft Windows and ReactOS used to manage and configure the operating system from the command-line. It is also part of the IBM PC Network Program for DOS.

Overview
The command is primarily used to manage network resources. It is an external command implemented as net.exe. When used in a batch file, the /Y or /N switches can be used to unconditionally answer Yes or No to questions returned by the command. The net command has several sub-commands that can differ from one implementation or operating system version to another.

This version only supports the use and view sub-commands.

Example
The net use command has several network-related functions.

Connecting network drive and printer
net use can control mounting ("mapping" in Microsoft terminology) drive shares and connecting shared printers in a network environment.  This command makes use of the SMB (server message block) and the NetBIOS protocol on port 139 or 445.  The basic Windows XP configuration enables this functionality by default.  Thus users can connect to and disconnect from shared resources such as computers, printers and drives.

net use can display a list of network-connection information on shared resources.

Null session connections
net use also connects to the IPC$ (interprocess communication share).  This is the so-called null session connection, which allows unauthenticated users.
The basic syntax for connecting anonymously is:
net use \\IP address\IPC$ "" /u:""
For example, typing at the command prompt:
net use \\192.168.1.101\IPC$ "" /u:""
attempts to connect to the share IPC$ of the network 192.168.1.101 as an anonymous user with blank password. If successfully connected to the target machine, a lot of information can be gathered such as shares, users, groups, registry keys and more.  This would provide a hacker with a lot of information about a remote user. This has changed in Windows NT 4.0 SP6 already. In Windows 2000 "null session connections" could have been enabled after changes of the system-configuration.

Similar commands in other OSes
Novell NetWare
map for mapping volumes (network drives) to drive letters
capture for capturing print queues to LPT ports

See also
List of DOS commands
MS-Net

References

Further reading

External links

 Microsoft TechNet
 

Microcomputer software
OS/2 commands
Windows administration
Windows communication and services